Thunder Lake is a lake in Alberta, Canada.

Description 

Thunder Lake Provincial Park is established on the north-eastern shore of the lake, and the community of Thunder Lake on the southeastern shore.

See also
List of lakes in Alberta

References

County of Barrhead No. 11
Thunder Lake